Calvin Thompson (born June 27, 1964) is an American basketball coach and a member of the University of Kansas' 1986 Final Four team. He holds Kansas' record for most consecutive free throws made at 33 in 1983–84, made second-team All-Big Eight in 1983 and 1984, and the All-Big Eight Tournament team 1983 and 1984. He was also a member of the 1986 All-NCAA Midwest Regional team.

Playing career
On June 17, 1986, the New York Knicks selected Thompson in Round 4 with Pick 1 in the 1986 NBA draft.

Calvin played two seasons in the Continental Basketball Association (CBA) after brief stints in camp with the Los Angeles Clippers, Indiana Pacers, Chicago Bulls, and the San Antonio Spurs.

After spending time in camp with the Spurs he was offered a contract by the Houston Rockets and Lyon out of France. He chose to venture to France where he played professionally for two years, then another five years in Israel.

Thompson finished his college career tied for first for games started and games played in a season, third in minutes played, fourth in scoring, fifth in assists, seventh in steals, 13th in blocks, and 19th in rebounds in Kansas Jayhawk history.

During his first CBA season where he averaged 21 ppg, and 5 rebounds per game, he was named CBA Rookie Runner-Up Of The Year and he was the first rookie to be named to the CBA's All Star Game. In May 1987 (CBA off-season) participated with Formula Shell in the Philippines. He averaged 42 points and 8 rebounds per game.

Coaching career
Thompson coached the Kansas City Mustangs of the Women's Basketball Association professional league in 1995.

After retiring, he founded Hoop Service Bulldogs (now the Junior Sizzlers), which play under the ThreeFive, Inc. umbrella, a not-for-profit entity based out of Kansas City for both boys and girls grade 3–11.

In 2018, he was the coach of the Kansas City Tornados professional team in the North American Premier Basketball.

In June 2018, Thompson purchased the rights of the Topeka Sizzlers of the semi-pro league American Basketball Association (ABA). He will service as both the Head Coach and General Manager of the team. Prior to the Covid pandemic, the Sizzlers were relocated to the Kansas City area and now play independently as the KC Sizzlers (www.kcsizzlers.org).

Thompson currently serves as the Building Sub for Westridge Middle School in the Shawnee Mission school district.

References

1964 births
Living people
American expatriate basketball people in the Philippines
American men's basketball players
Kansas City Tornadoes coaches
Kansas Jayhawks men's basketball players
North American Premier Basketball coaches
Philippine Basketball Association imports
Shell Turbo Chargers players
Basketball players from Kansas City, Missouri
Sportspeople from Kansas City, Missouri
Topeka Sizzlers players